Portuguese invasion of the Banda Oriental may refer to:
Portuguese invasion of the Banda Oriental (1811–12), the first (unsuccessful) attempt
Portuguese invasion of the Banda Oriental (1816), the second and last invasion